Battle of the Bridge was a battle between Arab Muslims and the Sassanid Empire in 634.

Battle of the Bridge may refer to:

 Battle of Calderón Bridge (1811), Mexican War of Independence
 Battle of Great Bridge (1775), American War of Independence
 Battle of Moore's Creek Bridge (1776), American War of Independence
 Battle of Natural Bridge (1865), American Civil War
 Battle of the Bridge of Arcole (1796), French Revolutionary Wars
 Battle of the Bridge of Cornellana (842), between Nepotian of Asturias and Ramiro I
 Battle of the Milvian Bridge (312), between Roman Emperors Constantine I and Maxentius
 Battle of Stamford Bridge (1066), part of the Viking invasions of England
 Battle of Stirling Bridge (1297), First War of Scottish Independence
 Battle of Strasbourg Bridge (1634), Thirty Years' War
 Battle of the Bridge (Canisius–Niagara), American college rivalry between Canisius College and Niagara University
 Battle of the Bridge, a rugby union rivalry between Auckland and North Harbour Rugby Union, New Zealand
 Battle of the Bridges, 1990 Gulf War
 Sydney Derby (AFL), also referred to as the Battle of the Bridge
 Melbourne Victory FC–Western United FC rivalry, also referred to as the Battle of the Bridge